Harlow is a town in Essex, England.

Harlow may also mean:

People

 Bob Harlow (1899–1954), American golf administrator
 Bryce Harlow (1916–1987), Congressional staff member, army officer, and businessman
 Carol Harlow, British barrister and academic
 Dick Harlow (1889–1962), American football coach
 Don Harlow (1942–2008), American Esparantist
 Donald L. Harlow (1942–1997), Chief Master Sergeant of the United States Air Force
 George H. Harlow (1830–1900), American politician
 George Henry Harlow (1787–1819), English artist
 Greg Harlow (Born 1968), Bowls player
 Harry Harlow (1905–1981), American psychologist
 Jack Harlow (born 1998), American rapper
 James Hayward Harlow, American engineer
 Jean Harlow (1911–1937), American actress
 Joel Harlow, American make-up artist 
 John Martyn Harlow (1819–1907), American physician to brain-injury survivor Phineas Gage
 Jules Harlow (born 1931), American rabbi
 Larry Harlow (salsa) (born 1939), American salsa music performer and composer
 Pat Harlow (born 1969), American football player
 Poppy Harlow (born 1982), American journalist
 Sean Harlow (born 1995), American football player
 Shalom Harlow (born 1973), Canadian supermodel and actress

Fictional characters
 Bobbi Harlow, a school teacher in the comic strip Bloom County
 Clarissa Harlowe, heroine of Samuel Richardson's novel Clarissa
 Red Harlow, protagonist of the 2004 video game Red Dead Revolver

Places
Harlow or Harlow Hill, Harrogate, an area of Harrogate, North Yorkshire, England
Harlow (UK Parliament constituency)
Harlow, North Dakota, United States, an unincorporated community

Films
 Harlow (Paramount film), a 1965 Paramount Pictures biographical film about actress Jean Harlow 
 Harlow (Magna film), a 1965 Magna biographical film about the actress

Other 
Harlow (given name)
Harlow (typeface)
Harlow Aircraft Company
House of Harlow, an American jewelry brand

See also
Harrow (disambiguation)